Barnabás Peák (born 29 November 1998) is a Hungarian cyclist, who currently rides for UCI ProTeam .

In June 2019, Peák was announced to be joining UCI WorldTeam  as a stagiaire during the 2019 season, before competing full-time with the team from 2020.

Major results

2016
 National Junior Road Championships
1st  Road race
1st  Time trial
 1st  Mountains classification, Grand Prix Général Patton
 UEC European Junior Road Championships
7th Time trial
8th Road race
2017
 1st  Road race, National Under-23 Road Championships
 1st Banja Luka–Belgrade I
 2nd Time trial, National Road Championships
 2nd Overall Tour de Hongrie
1st  Young rider classification
1st  Hungarian classification
 5th GP Kranj
 9th Törökbálint GP
2018
 National Road Championships
1st  Road race
1st  Time trial
 3rd Overall Vuelta al Bidasoa
1st Stage 2
 7th Overall Tour de Serbie
 9th Gran Piemonte
2019
 1st Stage 5 Tour de Normandie
 National Road Championships
2nd Road race
3rd Time trial
 8th Grand Prix Cycliste de Gemenc II
2020
 National Road Championships
1st  Time trial
5th Road race
2021
 5th Road race, National Road Championships
2022
 National Road Championships
2nd Time trial
3rd Road race
 2nd Ronde van Drenthe
 3rd Visegrad 4 Kerékpárverseny
 9th Tour du Doubs

General classification results timeline

Classics results timeline

Major championships timeline

References

External links

1998 births
Living people
Hungarian male cyclists
Cyclists from Budapest